Wolongia is a genus of Asian long-jawed orb-weavers that was first described by M. S. Zhu, J. P. Kim & D. X. Song in 1997.

Species
 it contains eleven species, found in East Asia:
Wolongia bicruris Wan & Peng, 2013 – China
Wolongia bimacroseta Wan & Peng, 2013 – China
Wolongia erromera Wan & Peng, 2013 – China
Wolongia foliacea Wan & Peng, 2013 – China
Wolongia guoi Zhu, Kim & Song, 1997 (type) – China
Wolongia mutica Wan & Peng, 2013 – China
Wolongia odontodes Zhao, Yin & Peng, 2009 – China
Wolongia papafrancisi Malamel, Nafin, Sankaran & Sebastian, 2018 – India
Wolongia renaria Wan & Peng, 2013 – China
Wolongia tetramacroseta Wan & Peng, 2013 – China
Wolongia wangi Zhu, Kim & Song, 1997 – China

See also
 List of Tetragnathidae species

References

Araneomorphae genera
Spiders of China
Tetragnathidae